"I Will Always Love You" is a song written by Dolly Parton and covered by Whitney Houston.
 
I Will Always Love You may also refer to:

Music
I Will Always Love You and Other Greatest Hits, an album by Dolly Parton
I Will Always Love You: The Best of Whitney Houston, an album by Whitney Houston
 "I Will Always Love You" (Troop song), 1990
"I Will Always Love You", a song by Kenny Rogers from Eyes That See in the Dark

Other media
I Will Always Love You (film), a Filipino movie starring Richard Gutierrez and Angel Locsin
I Will Always Love You, a Gossip Girl novel by Cecily von Ziegesar

See also
 I'll Always Love You (disambiguation)
 Inday Will Always Love You,  a 2018 Philippine television drama